Cyrillization or Cyrillisation is the process of rendering words of a language that normally uses a writing system other than Cyrillic script into (a version of) the Cyrillic alphabet. Although such a process has often been carried out in an ad hoc fashion, the term "cyrillization" usually refers to a consistent system applied, for example, to transcribe names of German, Chinese, or English people and places for use in Russian, Ukrainian, Serbian, Macedonian or Bulgarian newspapers and books. Cyrillization is analogous to romanization, when words from a non-Latin script-using language are rendered in the Latin alphabet for use (e.g., in English, German, or Francophone literature.)

Just as with various Romanization schemes, each Cyrillization system has its own set of rules, depending on:
 The source language or writing system (English, French, Arabic, Hindi, Kazakh in Latin alphabet, Chinese, Japanese, etc.),
 The destination language or writing system (Russian, Ukrainian, Bulgarian, Kazakh in Cyrillic, etc.),
 the goals of the systems:
 to render occasional foreign words (mostly personal and place names) for use in newspapers or on maps;
 to provide a practical approximate phonetic transcription in a phrasebook or a bilingual dictionary;
 or to convert a language to a Cyrillic writing system altogether (e.g., Dungan, Kazakh)
 Linguistic and/or political inclinations of the designers of the system (see, for example, the use—or disuse—of the letter Ґ for rendering the "G" of foreign words in Ukrainian).

When the source language uses a fairly phonetic spelling system (e.g., Spanish, Turkish), a Cyrillization scheme may often be adopted that almost amounts to a transliteration, i.e., using a mapping scheme that simply maps each letter of the source alphabet to some letter of the destination alphabet, sometimes augmented by position-based rules. Among such schemes are several schemes universally accepted in Eastern Slavic languages:

 Cyrillization of Arabic
 Cyrillization of Chinese
 Cyrillization of English - e.g. Cyrillisch
 Cyrillization of Esperanto
 Cyrillization of French
 Cyrillization of German
 Cyrillization of Greek
 Cyrillization of Hindi
 Cyrillization of Italian
 Cyrillization of Japanese - e.g. Polivanov system
 Cyrillization of Korean
 Cyrillization of Kurdish
 Cyrillization of Manchu
 Cyrillization of Polish
 Cyrillization of Portuguese
 Cyrillization of Spanish

Similarly, simple schemes are widely used to render words from Latin-script languages into Cyrillic-script languages.

When the source language does not use a particularly phonetic writing system—most notably English and French—its words are typically rendered in Russian, Ukrainian, or other Cyrillic-based languages using an approximate phonetic transcription system, which aims to allow the Cyrillic readers to approximate the sound of the source language as much as it is possible within the constraints of the destination language and its orthography. Among the examples are the Practical transcription of English into Russian, which aims to render English words into Russian based on their sounds, and Transliteration of foreign words by a Cyrillic alphabet (:uk:Транслітерація іншомовних слів кирилицею) and Cyrillization of the English language (:uk:Кирилізація англійської мови) in the case of Ukrainian. While this scheme is mostly accepted by a majority of Russian and Ukrainian authors and publishers, transcription variants are not uncommon.

A transliteration system for the Bulgarian Cyrillization of English has been designed by the Bulgarian linguist Andrey Danchev.

Similarly, phonetic schemes are widely adopted for Cyrillization of French, especially considering the fairly large number of French loanwords that have been borrowed into Russian.

See also
 Cyrillisation in the Soviet Union
 Транскрибиране на български език  - Transcription into the Bulgarian
 Транскрипция  - the articles on Transcription in the Russian Wikipedia
 Rules for practical English-Russian transcription 
 Transcription of German into Cyrillic 
 Транскрипція  - the articles on Transcription in the Ukrainian Wikipedia
 Cyrillization of English 
 Transliteration of English and German words by a Cyrillic alphabet 
 Македонска транскрипција на странските јазици  - Macedonian transcription of foreign languages
 Volapuk encoding

References 

 A. Danchev, Bulgarian transcription of English names, Narodna Prosveta, Sofia, 1982 (in Bulgarian)
 R.S. Gilyrevsky (Гиляревский Р. С.), editor: "Practical Transcription of Personal and Family Names" (Практическая транскрипция фамильно-именных групп.) Moscow, Fizmatliz, 2004. . — (covers 6 European languages, as well as Arabic, Chinese, Turkish, and Japanese)
 same, 2nd edition; Moscow, Nauka, 2006, 526. . (11 European languages, as well as Arabic, Chinese, Turkish, Hindi, Vietnamese, Korean, and Japanese)
 R.S. Gilyrevsky (Гиляревский Р. С.), B.A. Starostin (Старостин Б. А.) "Foreign Names in the Russian Text: A Handbook" (Иностранные имена и названия в русском тексте: Справочник). 3rd edition. Moscow, Vysshaya Shkola, 1985.
 D.I. Ermolovich (Ермолович Д. И.) "Personal Names at the Junction of Languages and Cultures" (Имена собственные на стыке языков и культур). Moscow, R. Valent, 2001. . (23 languages)
 D.I. Ermolovich (Ермолович Д. И.) "Personal Names: Theory and Practice of Interlanguage Transmission at the Junction of Languages and Cultures" (Имена собственные: теория и практика межъязыковой передачи на стыке языков и культур.  Moscow, R. Valent, 2005. .
 R.A. Lidin (Лидин Р. А). "Foreign family names and personal names. Spelling and pronunciation. Practical transcription into Russian: Dictionary Handbook" (Иностранные фамилии и личные имена. Написание и произношение. Практическая транскрипция на русский язык: Словарь-справочник) Moscow, Vneshsigma, 1998. .

 
Transliteration